Jean-Baptiste Poux (born 26 September 1979) is a former French rugby union footballer who played as a prop, and was capable of playing loosehead and tighthead. Poux began his professional rugby career at RC Narbonne in 1998 before moving to Toulouse, where he was a part of the side that won the 2003, 2005 and 2010 Heineken Cups. In 2013, Poux joined Union Bordeaux Bègles. Poux has also played for the France national team, and was included in their 2003, 2007, and 2011 Rugby World Cup squads.

References

External links

RBS 6 Nations profile
Jean-Baptiste Poux on rwc2003.irb.com
Jean-Baptiste Poux on ercrugby.com

1979 births
Living people
Sportspeople from Béziers
French rugby union players
France international rugby union players
Stade Toulousain players
Rugby union props